Pramanta is a village and a former municipality in the Ioannina regional unit, Epirus, Greece. Since the 2011 local government reform it is part of the municipality North Tzoumerka, of which it is a municipal unit. In 2011 its population was 1,137 for the town, 1,527 for the community and 1,774 for the municipal unit. The municipal unit has an area of 69.058 km2, the community 39.435 km2. Pramanta is situated in the Athamanika mountains, at about 840m elevation. It is 4 km west of Melissourgoi, 6 km north of Agnanta, 6 km south of Prosilio, 65 km southeast of Ioannina, 70 km north east of Arta and 28 km south of Metsovo.

Subdivisions
The municipal unit Pramanta is subdivided into the following communities (constituent villages in brackets):
Ampelochori
Pramanta (Pramanta, Tsopela, Christoi)
Raftanaioi (Raftanaioi, Vounoreia, Zalouchos, Megali Rachi, Mylokopeio, Palaiomochousti, Pallikari, Plaka, Rouga, Fraxos)

Population

Attractions 
In the central square one can view the known perennial plane tree, the historic fountain called "Arapis" and the central church of the village, Agia Paraskevi. Close to Pramanta is the "Anemotrypa" cave with its underground river, the 13th century Kipina Monastery built into a rocky mountain, and the mountain retreat in the place "Isioma".

External links
Pramanta (municipality) on GTP Travel Pages
Pramanta (town) on GTP Travel Pages

References

Populated places in Ioannina (regional unit)